Jesús Casas García  (born 23 October 1973) is a Spanish football coach and current manager of the Iraq national team.

Managerial and coaching career

Early career
Casas began his coaching career at age 29 with the youth sides of Cádiz CF. He later worked as match analyst for SD Eibar and FC Barcelona B, before becoming a scout and match analyst at FC Barcelona. He then returned to Cádiz, to become a director of their youth department, and in January 2018, he became an assistant to Javi Gracia at Watford.

In summer 2018, Casas became an assistant to Luis Enrique and Robert Moreno in the Spain national team, a position he held until February 2022.

Iraq
On 5 November 2022, the IFA confirmed that Casas would take charge of the national team for four years on an annual payment of $1m split into monthly wages. Radhi Shenaishil was supposed to lead the national team for the Mexico and Ecuador friendly games in Spain, while Casas would take charge of the games against Costa Rica and Venezuela in Iraq, with his first game coming on 17 November 2022. The following matches were cancelled, as for Costa Rica match due to passport stamp issues at the border, while the match against Venezuela was called off for an unknown reason. He began with the national team officially on 30 December 2022 in a friendly against Kuwait as a preparatory match for the 25th Arabian Gulf Cup in Basra, which they eventually won after a 3–2 victory over Oman in the final, to be their first title in the competition since 1988.

Managerial statistics

Honours

Manager
Iraq
Arabian Gulf Cup: 2023

References

External links

1973 births
Living people
Footballers from Madrid
Iraq national football team managers
Expatriate football managers in Iraq
Spanish expatriate sportspeople in Iraq
Spanish footballers
Cádiz CF B players
Atlético Sanluqueño CF players
Jerez Industrial CF players
Chiclana CF players
Spanish football managers
Spanish expatriate football managers
Cádiz CF B managers